Emma Yefimova (28 September 1931 – 12 July 2004) was a Soviet fencer. She competed in the women's individual foil event at the 1956 Summer Olympics.

References

External links
 

1931 births
2004 deaths
Russian female foil fencers
Soviet female foil fencers
Olympic fencers of the Soviet Union
Fencers at the 1956 Summer Olympics
Martial artists from Moscow